Amedee Army Airfield  is a military use airport located nine nautical miles (17 km) north of the central business district of Herlong, in Lassen County, California, United States. It is owned by the United States Army and located at the Sierra Army Depot in the Honey Lake Valley, east of the Sierra Nevada mountain range.

History
The airfield was built by the United States Army Air Forces about 1942, and was known as Reno Army Air Base Auxiliary Flight Strip. It was an emergency landing airfield for military aircraft on training flights.  After World War II, the airfield was retained by the Army, and is used as part of the Sierra Army Depot.  It was also known as Honey Lake Flight Strip.

Facilities 
Amedee AAF has one runway designated 8/26 with an asphalt surface measuring 10,000 by 150 feet (3,048 x 46 m).

See also

California during World War II
 California World War II Army Airfields

References 

 www.airfieldsdatabase.com

External links 
 Sierra Army Depot
 
 

Airfields of the United States Army Air Forces in California
Flight Strips of the United States Army Air Forces
Airports in Lassen County, California
United States Army airfields